{{DISPLAYTITLE:C15H20Cl2N2}}
The molecular formula C15H20Cl2N2 (molar mass: 299.24 g/mol) may refer to:

 BD1018, a selective sigma receptor ligand
 BD1031, a selective sigma receptor agonist

Molecular formulas